Manzu may refer to:

 Giacomo Manzù, an Italian sculptor (1908–1991).
 Mǎnzú, a Chinese spelling of Manchu people.
 Mânzu, a village in Cilibia Commune, Buzău County, Romania